Mateo & Matos is a team of two American deejays and house music producers John "Roc" Mateo and Eddie "E-Z" Matos from New York City, United States.

History 
John "Roc" Mateo and Eddie "E-Z" Matos were both influenced by late 1970s disco. John Mateo started by broadcasting sets over his CB radio in 1985. It was through this self-produced show that Eddie Matos first made contact with John Mateo. They became friends and shortly afterward became professional partners. They have been inspired by listening to Larry Levan, Tony Humphries, Shep Pettibone and Little Louie Vega. They were introduced to Vega later that year, learning about studio production and engineering from him, and by 1989, they were working on their own productions. In the years from 1986 through 1989 Mateo & Matos performed at a large number of club festivals and old school block parties in the tri-state area of New York. After several releases on  their own Final Cut Records label, they went on to record for Oxygen Music Works, Henry Street, Nervous Records, Nite Grooves and Spiritual Life Music in the mid-1990s. Their debut album as producers, New York Rhythms, appeared on the Scottish Glasgow Underground Recordings label in 1997, with a second volume appearing the following year. In 1999, these were followed by The Many Shades of Mateo & Matos.

They have since brought their work to deejay appearances in over 30 countries and dozens of original productions and remixes on record labels such as Manuscript Records Ukraine, King Street Records, Defected Records, and Large Records.

Discography
 1994 - Raw elements - Black label Recordings
 1996 - Essential elements - Nite Grooves
 1997 - New York rhythms - Glasgow Underground Recordings
 1997 - Deeper dimensions EP (part 2) - Nite grooves
 1998 - Mixed moods EP - Spiritual Life Music
 1998 - New York rhythms Remix EP - Glasgow Underground Recordings
 1998 - New York rhythms Volume two - Glasgow Underground Recordings
 1998 - Images EP - 4th Floor Records
 1999 - Frontiers EP - Large records
 1999 - The Many Shades of Mateo & Matos - Glasgow Underground Recordings
 2001 - Inspirations - Glasgow Underground
 2002 - After midnite EP - Large records
 2003 - Enter Our World - Glasgow Underground
 2004 - Essential elements - Nite Grooves
 2006 - Soul spirit EP - West End Records
 2010 - Want u tonight - Manuscript Records Ukraine
 2012 - "House Legends: Mateo & Matos" - King Street Sounds (#KSD204)

Remixes 
 1995 - Lift him up - King Street Sounds
 1995 - Sex on my mind - King Street Sounds
 1997 - Get up (remixes) - Nervous Records
 1998 - Beng Beng Beng - Sound of Barclay
 2001 - Faith - D:Vision records
 2005 - Joey Negro in the house - ITH Records
 2006 - For the love of house - ITH Records

References

External links 
 Official website
 Official website at MySpace

Record producers from New York (state)
Remixers
American dance music groups
American house music groups
Electronic music groups from New York (state)
Electronic music duos
Record production duos
Club DJs
1986 establishments in New York City
Musical groups established in 1986